Jimmy Stepanoff (born February 15, 1959) is a German visual artist and painter, mostly known for his work in movies The NeverEnding Story and The Name of the Rose and the painting & comics cycle “Die Nibelungen”.

Early life 
He was born in Žitište, Banat region in Serbia, in the family of Danube Swabians. His full name is Friedrich Hieronymus Freiherr von Unterreiner.

Career 

In the late seventies he moved to Munich, Germany, where he did animated movies, design and graphics. He started in the film industry in 1979, doing storyboards, backgrounds and artistic concepts for films. He worked in about 60 featured movies and The Name of the Rose.

He had some 40 solo painting exhibitions. He is the author of a highly evaluated comics and painting epic cycle with over 200 works, including “Die Nibelungen”.

He lives and works in Munich. He is also a member of Serbian Comics Authors' Association (Udruženje stripskih umetnika Srbije).

Bibliography (choice) 
 Behind the dark, Ed. Painting Century Box, München, 2000.

Sources

External links 
  
 
 An essay about the artist, Lex-art 

1959 births
Living people
Artists from Munich
20th-century German painters
20th-century German male artists
German male painters
German illustrators
German comics artists
German comics writers
21st-century German painters
21st-century German male artists